Turnpike often refers to:
 A type of gate, another word for a turnstile
 In the United States, a toll road

Turnpike may also refer to:

Roads

United Kingdom
 A turnpike road, a principal road maintained by a turnpike trust, a body with powers to collect road tolls in Britain from the 17th but especially during the 18th and 19th centuries
 Turnpike Lane, Haringey, a street in Haringey, North London, England

United States
 Connecticut Turnpike, a former toll road in Connecticut, United States
 Delaware Turnpike, a toll road in Delaware, United States
 Florida's Turnpike, a toll road in Florida, United States
 Homestead Extension of Florida's Turnpike, a toll road in Florida, United States (part of Florida's Turnpike)
 Indiana Toll Road, a toll road in Indiana, United States (often called "the Indiana Turnpike")
 Kansas Turnpike, a toll road in Kansas, United States
 Kentucky Turnpike, a former toll road in Kentucky, United States
 Maine Turnpike, a toll road in Maine, United States
 Massachusetts Turnpike, a toll road in Massachusetts, United States
 Turnpikes in New Hampshire, United States
 Everett Turnpike, a toll road in central New Hampshire (built prior to the inception of the Interstate Highway System)
 Blue Star Turnpike (also known as the New Hampshire Turnpike), a toll road entirely located in Rockingham County, New Hampshire. Its entire route is concurrent with the NH portion of Interstate 95.
 Spaulding Turnpike, a toll road in eastern New Hampshire
 New Jersey Turnpike, a toll road in New Jersey, United States
 Ohio Turnpike, a toll road in Ohio, United States
 Turnpikes of Oklahoma, a turnpike system in Oklahoma, United States
 Pennsylvania Turnpike, a toll road in Pennsylvania, United States
 President George Bush Turnpike, a toll road in Texas, United States
 West Virginia Turnpike, a toll road in West Virginia, United States

Places
 Turnpike Stadium, the former name of Arlington Stadium in Arlington, Texas, United States
 Turnpike Esker, name of a Mi'kmaw portage trail in Digby County, Nova Scotia, Canada

Other uses
 Turnpike (ride), a former amusement ride at Kennywood in Pittsburgh, Pennsylvania, US
 Turnpike (software), an Internet software suite for Microsoft Windows
 Turnpike stair, the common name of a spiral staircase in Scottish architecture
 Turnpike theory, an economic theory deriving from the concept of the toll road being the fastest route between two points
 Turnpike Troubadours, a country band from Oklahoma, United States
 Mercury Turnpike Cruiser, a flagship model for the Mercury automotive division